Wurrawhy is an Australian pre-school themed TV show for young children. It premiered on Network Ten on 31 January 2011, and it later aired on Eleven and aired Monday to Friday from 9:30 am to 10:00 am and originally aired from 8:30 am to 9:00 am, then from 11:30 am to 12:00 pm, then back to 8:30 am to 9:00 am, then with Breakfast's cancellation in November 2012, it aired from 7:00 am to 7:30 am and on 4 November 2013, the show moved to Eleven at 9.30am to 10am, to accommodate new morning shows such as Studio 10, and its last episode was on 14 January 2016 after 5 years to make room for a new pre-school series called Crocamole.

The main character is Wubbleyoo, a computer mouse that has come to life who is inquisitive and eager. With his friend Lauren and KB the cat, they are eager to explore the world around them. A computer is used for the characters to explore the theme of each episode with icons representing "Who, What, When, Where and Why".

Cast
Michael Balk as Wubbleyoo
 Lauren Porter
 Lucy Flook as KB The Cat

See also 
 List of Australian television series

References

External links
 

Australian children's television series
Network 10 original programming
10 Peach original programming
2011 Australian television series debuts
2016 Australian television series endings
English-language television shows
Television shows set in Brisbane
Australian preschool education television series